John Christopher Simmons (born December 1, 1958) is a former American college and professional football player who was a defensive back in the National Football League (NFL) for seven seasons during the 1980s.  Simmons played college football for Southern Methodist University, and was recognized as an All-American.  He played professionally for the Cincinnati Bengals, Green Bay Packers, and Indianapolis Colts of the NFL.

Simmons was born in Little Rock, Arkansas.

References

External links
NFL.com player page
Stats

1958 births
Living people
All-American college football players
American football defensive backs
Cincinnati Bengals players
Green Bay Packers players
Indianapolis Colts players
Sportspeople from Little Rock, Arkansas
Players of American football from Arkansas
SMU Mustangs football players
National Football League replacement players